Garnet William Cooper Hyland (1908–1972) was an Australian rugby league player who played in the 1930s.

Career
Hyland came to St. George from Mudgee, New South Wales in 1930. He played four seasons with the club between 1930–1933, and played in the 1930 Grand Final. He used the name of Bill and Charlie whilst in Sydney but preferred to be known by his nickname Blue.

Death
Hyland died in Mudgee, New South Wales in 1972.

References

1908 births
1972 deaths
Australian rugby league players
Date of birth missing
Rugby league players from New South Wales
Rugby league props
Rugby league second-rows
St. George Dragons players